Michael D. Weiss is an American journalist and author. He is news director at the New Lines magazine, contributing editor at The Daily Beast, director of special investigations at the Free Russia Foundation and the coauthor of ISIS: Inside the Army of Terror.

Education
Weiss was born to a Jewish family and educated at Townsend Harris High School, a public magnet high school in Flushing, Queens in New York City, from which he graduated in 1998, followed by Dartmouth College in 2002 with a B.A. in History.

Life and career
In 2010, Weiss criticized British Prime Minister David Cameron after Cameron, during a speech delivered in Ankara, referred to Gaza as a "prison camp". Weiss wrote that Turkish Prime Minister Recep Tayyip Erdoğan "is the man whom David Cameron was out to please ... Brutal occupation of Cyprus, subjugation of a Kurdish minority in everything from politics to linguistics, and ongoing denial of the Armenian genocide are evidently Maastricht-compatible initiatives to the new British prime minister".

In 2012, Weiss served as co-chair of the Russia Studies Centre at the trans-Atlantic foreign policy think tank Henry Jackson Society (HJS).

In November 2014, Weiss published a special report in his online magazine The Interpreter that accused Russia of waging "propaganda and disinformation" campaigns. Weiss's report included recommendations on how to confront Russian propaganda which included creating an "internationally recognized ratings system for disinformation." The recommendations were criticized in an article written by James Carden (executive director of the lobbying organization American Committee for East–West Accord) in The Nation as a "censorship campaign."

In March 2015, in an article cowritten with Michael Pregent, Weiss accused Iran-backed Iraqi Shia militias of committing extensive atrocities against Sunni civilians in the course of their war against the Islamic State of Iraq and the Levant, including "burning people alive in their houses, playing soccer with severed human heads, and ethnically cleansing and razing whole villages to the ground." Weiss and Pregent suggested that "Iran's Shi'ite militias aren't a whole lot better than the Islamic State."

In 2015, he co-wrote the book ISIS: Inside the Army of Terror with Hassan Hassan.

In 2016, Weiss called Russia a terrorist state and said that "Russian corruption has been described as one of the country’s chief exports".

Weiss joined CNN in April 2017.

Weiss currently serves as the editor-in-chief for the online magazine Interpreter, which translates and analyzes Russian news, and contributing editor of The Daily Beast.

Personal life
He is married to Amy Thirjung.

References

External links

21st-century American journalists
Living people
American foreign policy writers
American male non-fiction writers
Journalists from New York City
Jewish American journalists
American male journalists
American political journalists
CNN people
Dartmouth College alumni
Townsend Harris High School alumni
Year of birth missing (living people)
21st-century American Jews